Abortion in Nebraska is legal up to the 20th week of pregnancy, except in the municipalities of Hayes Center, Blue Hill, Stapleton, Arnold, Paxton, Brady, Hershey, and Wallace where abortion has been outlawed by local ordinance. In a 2014 poll conducted by the Pew Research Center, 50% of Nebraskan adults said that abortion should be legal in all or most cases while 46% said abortion should be illegal in most or all cases.

The number of abortion clinics in Nebraska has fluctuated over the years, with eight in 1982, nine in 1992 and three in 2014.  There were 2,270 legal abortions in 2014, and 2,004 in 2015.

History

Legislative history 

Nebraska was one of 23 states in 2007 to have a detailed abortion-specific informed consent requirement. Mississippi, Nebraska, North Dakota and Ohio all had statues in 2007 that required specific informed consent on abortion but also, by statue, allowed medical doctors performing abortions to disassociate themselves with the anti-abortion materials they were required to provide to their female patients.

In 2010, Nebraska became the first state to use the disputed notion of fetal pain as a rationale to ban abortion after 20 weeks. In 2013, state Targeted Regulation of Abortion Providers (TRAP) law applied to medication induced abortions and private doctor offices in addition to abortion clinics.

Judicial history 
The US Supreme Court's decision in 1973's Roe v. Wade ruling meant the state could no longer regulate abortion in the first trimester. (However, the Supreme Court overturned Roe v. Wade in Dobbs v. Jackson Women's Health Organization,  later in 2022.) Stenberg v. Carhart  was before the US Supreme Court in June 2000. The ruling meant the state's  "partial-birth abortion" was ruled unconstitutional by the US Supreme Court as it did not consider the life of the mother. 29 other states were impacted by this ruling. LeRoy Carhart, a Nebraska physician who specialized in late-term abortions, brought suit against Don Stenberg, the Attorney General of Nebraska, seeking declaratory judgment that a state law banning certain forms of abortion was unconstitutional, based on the undue burden test mentioned by a dissenting opinion in City of Akron v. Akron Center for Reproductive Health and by the Court in Planned Parenthood v. Casey. Both a federal district court and the U.S. Court of Appeals ruled in favor of Carhart before the case was appealed to the Supreme Court. The Nebraska statute prohibited "partial birth abortion", which it defined as any abortion in which the physician "partially delivers vaginally a living unborn child before killing the unborn child and completing the delivery."

Clinic history 

Between 1982 and 1992, the number of abortion clinics in the state increased by one, going from eight in 1982 to nine in 1992. In 2014, there were three abortion clinics in the state. That year, 97% of the counties in the state did not have an abortion clinic. That year, 41% of women in the state aged 15 – 44 lived in a county without an abortion clinic. In 2017, there were two Planned Parenthood clinics in a state with a population of 420,419 women aged 15 – 49 of which two offered abortion services.

Statistics 
In the period between 1972 and 1974, there were no recorded illegal abortion death in the state. In 1990, 175,000 women in the state faced the risk of an unintended pregnancy. Public opinion on abortion is divided. In 2014, 50% of adults said in a poll by the Pew Research Center that abortion should be legal while 46% believed it should be illegal in all or most cases. In 2017, the state had an infant mortality rate of 5.6 deaths per 1,000 live births.

Abortion rights views and activities

Protests 
Women from the state participated in marches supporting abortion rights as part of a #StoptheBans movement in May 2019. At a protest at the Nebraska Capitol in Lincoln, more than 350 people participated. Former state Sen. Brenda Council was among those taking part.

Anti-abortion views and activities

Activities 
Bishop Fabian Bruskewitz excommunicated Catholics in his jurisdiction who were associated with Catholics for Choice in 1996, and the United States Conference of Catholic Bishops stated in 2000 that "[CFC] is not a Catholic organization, does not speak for the Catholic Church, and in fact promotes positions contrary to the teaching of the Church as articulated by the Holy See and the USCCB."

In 2004, Bruskewitz stated that he would deny the Eucharist to Catholic politicians who support abortion, including 2004 presidential candidate John Kerry.

Violence 
In 1977, there were four arson attacks on abortion clinics.  These took place in Minnesota, Vermont, Nebraska and Ohio.  Combined, they caused over US$1.1 million in damage.

Sanctuary cities for the unborn 
Eight cities in Nebraska have outlawed abortion within their city boundaries and declared themselves "sanctuary cities for the unborn." The village of Hayes Center, Nebraska, became the first city in Nebraska to outlaw abortion by local ordinance on April 6, 2021. The Hayes Center ordinance declares abortion to be "a murderous act of violence that purposefully and knowingly terminates a human life," and it outlaws abortion "at all times and at all stages of pregnancy." The only exception is for abortions performed "in response to a life-threatening physical condition aggravated by, caused by, or arising from a pregnancy" that "places the woman in danger of death or a serious risk of substantial impairment of a major bodily function unless an abortion is performed."

The city of Blue Hill, Nebraska, followed suit and enacted a similar ordinance outlawing abortion on April 13, 2021.

The village of Stapleton, Nebraska, enacted an ordinance outlawing abortion on August, 8, 2022.

On November 8, 2022 citizens in five villages in Western Nebraska (Arnold, Paxton, Brady, Hershey, and Wallace) saw local abortion bans pass in each one of their communities. 

Nebraska Governor Pete Ricketts (R) has praised the cities for their actions to outlaw abortion, issuing a statement that: "Nebraska is a pro-life state, and communities are working to recognize and protect innocent life in a variety of ways. The Biden-Harris Administration is pushing a radical, pro-abortion agenda, and Nebraska must do everything we can to stand against the abortion lobby."

References 

Nebraska
Healthcare in Nebraska
Women in Nebraska